Picrorhiza is a genus of flowering plants belonging to the family Plantaginaceae.

Its native range is Pakistan to Western Himalaya.

Species:

Picrorhiza kurroa 
Picrorhiza tungnathii

References

Plantaginaceae
Plantaginaceae genera